Roberto Riva (born 23 October 1986 in Monza) is an Italian artistic roller skater, 10 times world champion at the Artistic Skating World Championship.

Biography
Riva won the silver medal, in freeskating, at the 2009 World Games held in Kaohsiung.

Achievements

See also
 Most successful athlete in each sport at the World Championships

References

External links
  Roberto Riva profile

1986 births
Artistic roller skaters
Living people
Sportspeople from Monza
World Games silver medalists
Competitors at the 2009 World Games